The 2013 Giro d'Italia Femminile, also known as the 2013 Giro Rosa, was the 24th consecutive Giro d'Italia Femminile, the most prestigious Italian stage race in the women's road cycling calendar for 2013. It was held over eight stages between 30 June and 7 July 2013, starting in Giovinazzo, Apulia, and finishing with an individual time trial in Cremona, Lombardy.

Teams

Stages

Stage 1
30 June 2013 – Giovinazzo to Margherita de Savioa,

Stage 2
1 July 2013 – Pontecagnano Faiano to Pontecagnano Faiano,

Stage 3
2 July 2013 – Cerro al Volturno to Cerro al Volturno,

Stage 4
3 July 2013 – Monte San Vito to Castelfidardo,

Stage 5
4 July 2013 – Varazze to Monte Beigua,

Stage 6
5 July 2013 – Terme di Premia to San Domenico,

Stage 7
6 July 2013 – Corbetta to Corbetta,

Stage 8
7 July 2013 – Cremona to Cremona (individual time trial),

Classification leadership

Classification standings

General classification

Points classification

Mountains classification

Young Riders classification

Italian Riders classification

Team classification
Obsolete – data not currently available for Stages 3 onwards

References

Giro d'Italia Femminile
2013 in Italian sport
Giro d'Italia Femminile